Frederick Alexander Kidd (July 29, 1921 – March 22, 1997) was a provincial level politician and Geologist from Alberta, Canada. He served as a member of the Legislative Assembly of Alberta in the governing Progressive Conservative caucus from 1975 to 1979.

Early life
Frederick Alexander Kidd was born in Nordegg, Alberta. He grew up in south western Alberta and became a geologist.

Political career
Kidd ran for a seat to the Alberta Legislature in the 1975 Alberta election. He was elected to represent the renamed electoral district of Banff with a landslide victory over three other candidates. He served in the back benches of the governing Progressive Conservative caucus until 1979. During his service he served on a number of committees. He did not run for a second term in office when the legislature was dissolved in 1979.

He died on March 22, 1997.

References

External links
Legislative Assembly of Alberta Members Listing

1921 births
1997 deaths
People from Clearwater County, Alberta
Progressive Conservative Association of Alberta MLAs